Casio V.P.A.M. calculators are scientific calculators made by Casio which use Casio's Visually Perfect Algebraic Method (V.P.A.M.), Natural Display or Natural V.P.A.M. input methods.

V.P.A.M. is an infix system for entering mathematical expressions, used by Casio in most of its current scientific calculators. In the infix notation the precedence of mathematical operators is taken into account. According to Casio, in V.P.A.M. calculations can be input exactly as they are normally written. Functions, operators and symbols are shown on the calculator display and calculations are performed according to operator precedence.

History
The V.P.A.M. name was first introduced in 1994 with the introduction of the fx-991S and other "S" series scientific calculators in Japan. In 1998, the Casio fx-991W model used a two-tier (multi-line) display and the system was termed as S-V.P.A.M. (Super V.P.A.M.). The model featured a 5×6-dot LCD matrix cells on the top line of the screen and a 7-segment LCD on the bottom line of the screen that had been used in Casio fx-4500P programmable calculators. The S-V.P.A.M. system was also used in the other W series models and also the MS series of calculators that followed. V.P.A.M. is similar to the Direct Algebraic Logic (D.A.L.) used by Sharp in some of their scientific calculators.

The fx-82ES introduced by Casio in 2004 was the first calculator to incorporate the Natural Textbook Display (or Natural Display) system. It allowed the display of expressions of fractions, exponents, logarithms, powers and square roots etc. as they are written in a standard textbook. Natural Display uses natural representation of mathematical expressions and formulas through a 96×31 dot matrix LCD display. Casio uses the term Natural V.P.A.M. for the fx-ES Plus series of calculators which are the upgraded version of the fx-ES series.

In early 2015, Casio introduced a new line of calculators called CLASSWIZ for different markets, featuring a high resolution (192×63) dot matrix Natural Textbook Display and incorporating spreadsheet functions in some models. This series of calculators is called the fx-EX series and it succeeds the fx-ES Plus series of calculators.

In late 2022, Casio introduced a second generation of CLASSWIZ line, called fx-CW. Calculators in this line have an updated user interface, and comes with 4-gradation display.

List of calculators
Note: Italic figures in parentheses indicate the year of introduction, e.g.: (c. 1994)

V.P.A.M. (Visually perfect algebraic method)
Models:

fx-991S / 570S / 911S / 992S (c. 1994)
fx-115S / 100S / 122S (c. 1995)
fx-993S (c. 1996)
fx-300S (a simplified 8+2 digit version)

S-V.P.A.M. (Two-line, Multi-replay)

W-series
Changes to S-series calculators include:
2-line LCD display featuring 5×6-dot matrix cells top line and 7-segment LCD bottom line that had been used in Casio fx-4500P programmable calculators (used 5×7-dot matrix cells).
Models:
fx-991W / 570W / 115W / 100W / 115WA (c. 1998-99) 
fx-82TL  / 83W / 85W / 85WA / 300W / 350TL / 83WA / 270W (c. 1998-99)

MS-series
Revised variants of W Series of calculators including new functions such as:
Relocation of multiple functions into menus, previously featured in Casio fx-5500LA, but function is selected by numeric keypad
Multiple statement recall
Non-programmable models:
fx-991MS / 570MS / 115MS / 100MS / 95MS / 85MS / 350MS / 82MS (early 2000s)
fx-912MS (Japanese version of the fx-115MS)
fx-300MS (U.S. model)
OH-300MS (Overhead projection model), fx-100AU (Australia specific)
fx-500MS (Vietnam)
fx-290 (Japan)
fx-220 PLUS (International)

Programmable models:
fx-3650/3950P (International)
fx-3650P II (International)
fx-50F PLUS (International)
fx-50FH (Hong Kong)
fx-50FH II (Hong Kong)
fx-72F (Japan)

Natural Textbook Display

Revised version  of the MS Series including the following changes:
Mutli-line 96×31 dot matrix displays, but character cells are connected by dots like graphing calculators
The ability to display and edit mathematical formulae in more visual formats
Revised design of function menu interface, previously featured in Casio fx-4800P
No engineering symbol (SI prefixes) input or display facility, which was available in certain MS / W / S series models (fx-100, 115, 570 and 991MS / W / S).

Model-specific features include:
Numerical integration uses Gauss–Kronrod quadrature formula
Models:
fx-991ES / 570ES / 115ES (c. 2004)
fx-500ES / 350ES / 300ES / 85ES / 83ES / 82ES (c. 2004)
OH-300ES (Overhead projection model)
FC-100/200V (financial functions)

Natural V.P.A.M.
Models:
fx-82AU PLUS II (Australia)
fx-100AU PLUS (Australia)
fx-82ES PLUS A (China, simplified Chinese messages)
fx-82 / 95 / 350 / 570 / 991ES PLUS (c. 2008-09)
fx-115 / 300ES PLUS (U.S.)
fx-991ES PLUS C (Canadian version of fx-115ES PLUS)
fx-82 / 85 / 87 / 991DE PLUS (Germany)
fx-85GT/fx-83GT Plus (EU specific)
fx-82 / 991ZA Plus (South Africa)
fx-373 / 913 / 573 / 993ES (2008) (Japan)
fx-375 / 915 / 995ES (2012) (Japan)
fx-500 / 570VN PLUS (Vietnam)
fx-95 / 96SG PLUS (Singapore)
fx-991ID PLUS (Indonesia)
OH-300ES PLUS (Overhead projection model)
fx-FD10 Pro (International civil engineering model)

The CPU found in those models is based on the nX-U8/100 architecture.

ClassWiz (High-resolution Natural Textbook Display)

Changes to the ES PLUS series include:
Standard 192×63 display
Icon-based mode menu previously used on Casio fx-9700GE graphing calculators
Mode-specific functions are accessible via a unified function key as in fx-4800P
Model-specific features include:
Scientific constants and conversion functions are grouped into categories
Multilingual messages (excluding EX models and DE X models)
QR code export (excluding CN X models, VN X models and fx-530AZ STUDY CAL)
Multiline display supports up to 6 rows (excluding JP series, fx-530AZ STUDY CAL and fx-580VN X)
Vector mode now supports maximum 4-variable vectors and 4 user-defined vector storage
Matrix mode now supports maximum 4×4 matrices and 4 user-defined matrix storage
New spreadsheet mode (excluding CN X and VN X models)
Simultaneous linear equation solver supports up to 4 variables
Polynomial equation solver supports up to 4th degree equations and inequalities
Engineering symbols display and entry previously found in MS / W / S / D-series calculators
Periodic table mode with atomic weight information (JP900, 880BTG and 570/991 CE X only)

Models:

fx-82 / 85 / 350 / 570 / 991EX (2015 1Q) (International)
fx-JP500 / 700 / 900 and fx-530AZ STUDY CAL (late 2014) (Japan)
fx-87 / 991DE X (Germany)
fx-82 / 350 / 570 / 991CE X (Central Europe)
fx-85GT/83GT X (2019) (EU, UK)
fx-92 Spéciale Collège (France)
fx-92B Spéciale Collège (Belgium)
fx-82 / 350 / 570 / 991SP X II Iberia / fx-85SP X II Iberia (Portugal, Spain)
fx-82 / 350 / 570 / 991LA X (Latin America)
fx-82 / 95 / 570 / 991AR X Iberia, fx-95AR X, fx-570AR X, fx-991AR X (2015) (Middle East, Arabic Africa)
fx-82 / 95 / 350 / 991CN X 中文版 (Chinese Edition) (2014) (China)
fx-580VN X (Vietnam)
fx-97SG X (Singapore)
fx-880BTG (Vietnam)

References

See also
 Calculator input methods
 Prettyprint

V.P.A.M.